FIBA Europe Conference North was a basketball tournament of FIBA Europe Conference North held from 2002 to 2005. It was part of FIBA Europe Cup tournament. In tournament involving teams from Poland, Russia, Baltic States, Scandinavia, Belarus, Czech Republic and Ukraine. The tournament takes place in three stages. The first is the group stage, the second is playoff, and the third stage is the Final Four.

Final Conference north 2002/2003(A)

Final Conference north 2002/2003(B)

Final Conference north 2003/2004

Final Conference north 2004/2005

See also
 Eurocup Basketball
 EuroChallenge
 FIBA EuroCup Challenge
 FIBA Europe Conference South

External links
http://www.fibaeurope.com/default.asp
http://www.linguasport.com/baloncesto/internacional/clubes/FIBA_ECC/FIBA_ECC_e.htm

FIBA EuroChallenge